The 2020 ISSF World Cup is the annual edition of the ISSF World Cup in the Olympic shooting events, governed by the International Shooting Sport Federation.

Due to the COVID-19 pandemic, the only stage that went ahead as planned was the first stage of the shotgun world cup in Nicosia, Cyprus.

Men's results

Rifle events

Pistol events

Shotgun events

Women's results

Rifle events

Pistol events

Shotgun events

Mixed Team Results 

(BMM- Bronze-medal match)

Overall Medal Table 
Only includes medals from world cup shotgun, Nicosia (13/03/20)

References 

ISSF World Cup
ISSF World Cup